Gävleborg County is a county or län on the Baltic Sea coast of Sweden. It borders the counties of Uppsala, Västmanland, Dalarna, Jämtland and Västernorrland. The capital is Gävle.

Provinces 
Gävleborg County encompasses the provinces of Gästrikland and Hälsingland, except for the northwestern part of the latter which is located in Jämtland County, most notably Ytterhogdal.

Geography 
On the coast of the Gulf of Bothnia in east-central Sweden's Gävleborg län (county). It is made up of Dalarna, the majority of Hälsingland, and the traditional landskap (province) of Gästrikland. It slopes inward toward a forested highland despite being low and level by the coast.

Lakes 
 Gunnarsbosjön

Administration 
Gävleborg County was established in 1762 when it was separated from Västernorrland County. For the list of Governors see main article. 
The main aim of the County Administrative Board is to fulfil the goals set by the national policy by the Riksdag and the Government, to coordinate the interests and promote the development of the county, to establish regional goals and safeguard the due process of law in the handling of each case. The County Administrative Board is a Government Agency headed by a Governor. See List of Gävleborg Governors.

Politics 
The county council of Gävleborg or Region Gävleborg.

After the county council election in 2018, the following political parties are represented in the Gävleborg county council:

Riksdag elections 
The table details all Riksdag election results of Gävleborg County since the unicameral era began in 1970. The blocs denote which party would support the Prime Minister or the lead opposition party towards the end of the elected parliament.

Governors

Municipalities 

In Gästrikland Province:
Gävle
Hofors
Ockelbo
Sandviken

In Hälsingland Province:
Bollnäs
Hudiksvall
Ljusdal
Nordanstig
Ovanåker
Söderhamn

Demographics

Foreign background 
SCB have collected statistics on backgrounds of residents since 2002. These tables consist of all who have two foreign-born parents or are born abroad themselves. The chart lists election years and the last year on record alone.

Heraldry 
The arms for Gävleborg County is a combination of the arms of Gästrikland and Hälsingland. When it is shown with a royal crown it represents the County Administrative Board. Blazon: "Quartered, the arms of Gästrikland and the arms of Hälsingland."

See also 
Duke of Gästrikland & Duke of Hälsingland, titles for members of the royal family (see Duchies in Sweden)The tiles have been created for the first time for present Princess Madeleine, Duchess of Hälsingland and Gästrikland

References and notes

External links 

Gävleborg County Administrative Board
Gävleborg Regional Development Council
Gävleborg County Council

 

 
Counties of Sweden
Gästrikland
Hälsingland
1762 establishments in Sweden
States and territories established in 1762